Rollerball are an Australian stoner rock band formed in the Gold Coast, Queensland in 1998 and named after the 1975 film. They have released four full-length albums, SuperStructure, Oversize, Submarine and a European self-titled album which was a compilation based on their first two EPs.

Discography
Albums
 Rollerball (2002) – Waterdragon
 SuperStructure (2002) – Rhythm Ace
 Oversize (2004) – Rhythm Ace
 Submarine (2009) – Plus One Records

EPs
 Lost in Space (1999) – Rhythm Ace
 Let Your Hair Hang Down (2000) – Rhythm Ace
 Broken Open (2005) -
 "My First Cowboy"  (CD Split with OvO, Bar La Muerte/TMR)

Singles
 "Liftetime" – Rhythm Ace
 "Highly Likely" – Rhythm AceRhythm Ace
 "Common Thread"/"Broken Open"

References

External links
Scene Magazine Rollerball : Interview by Sam Kerr

Australian stoner rock musical groups
Queensland musical groups
Musical groups established in 1998